This is a list of capital cities of Pakistan and its current and former provinces, territories, and states.

National capital 
Islamabad officially became the capital of Pakistan on 14 August 1967, exactly 20 years after the country's independence. The first capital of Pakistan was the coastal city of Karachi in Sindh, which was selected by Muhammad Ali Jinnah. Karachi was and still is the largest city and economic capital of Pakistan. It remained the seat of government until 1959, when the military president, Ayub Khan, decided to build a new capital, Islamabad in the north of Pakistan, near the general headquarters of the Pakistani Armed Forces which is in Rawalpindi. During this process, Rawalpindi was the interim capital. It's believed the name of Islamabad was influenced from the Mughal name of the Bengali port city of Chittagong which was Islamabad. However it's also believed that the name was inspired by the alternate name of the Kashmiri city of Anantnag which also called Islamabad by the local Kashmiris.

In 1962, Dhaka was made the legislative capital of the country due to East Pakistan's high population.

The reasons for relocating the capital from Karachi are that it would reflect the diversity of the Pakistani people, it would be separated from the business and commercial activity of Karachi, and also it would be easily accessible from all parts of the country. The move to Islamabad was not completed until the late 1960s and for some years several government ministries were based in nearby Rawalpindi.

Regional capitals
The capitals of the provinces and territories of Pakistan have remained the same since the 1970s when the current administrative structure was established. All four provincial capitals are the largest cities of their respective provinces. Pakistan has a total population of 207,774,520 according to the 2017 census estimate.

Former provincial capitals
Federally Administered Tribal Areas: Miranshah/Parachinar (1947-2018)
East Bengal (later East Pakistan): Dacca (1947-1971)
West Pakistan: Lahore (1955-1970)

See also

List of historical national capitals
List of countries with multiple capitals
Administrative units of Pakistan
Former administrative units of Pakistan

References

External links
 Official Website of the Government of Gilgit Baltistan 

 
 
Pakistan
Capitals
Pakistan